The Button Islands are located in the Arctic Archipelago in the territory of Nunavut. They are surrounded by Ungava Bay, Hudson Strait, Labrador Sea, and they are on the north side of Gray Strait. The Button Islands measure .

The Button Islands consist of two groupings of islands lying in a northeast–southwest direction. They are barren, long, and narrow. The two groups are separated by a  navigable channel. The mid-channel depth is approximately  towards the northeast end.

One grouping includes Lacy Island, Lawson Island, Goodwin Island, and MacColl Island. The other includes Erhardt Island, Clark Island, King Island, Holdridge Island, Leading Island, Niels Island, and Dolphin Island.

References 

Archipelagoes of the Canadian Arctic Archipelago
Islands of Hudson Strait
Islands of the Labrador Sea
Uninhabited islands of Qikiqtaaluk Region